TeenNick may refer to:

 TeenNick, an American television channel
 TEENick, a former programming block on Nickelodeon and the namesake of the channel
 TeenNick (Italian TV channel)
 TeenNick (UK and Irish TV channel)
 TeenNick (Indian TV programming block), a programming block on Nick Jr. India